Classic Cars is a monthly British car magazine, focusing on buying, selling and driving classic cars. Outside of the UK, it is published as Thoroughbred & Classic Cars. The magazine was founded in October 1973 (as Classic Car) by IPC Magazines and was later acquired by Bauer Media Group.

References

Automobile magazines published in the United Kingdom
Bauer Group (UK)
Magazines established in 1973
Magazines published in London
Monthly magazines published in the United Kingdom